The Army Football Association (Army FA) is a county football association affiliated to The Football Association of England, for the administration of football within the British Army in the United Kingdom, Cyprus and Germany. The Army FA is based at Clayton Barracks in Aldershot, Hampshire. As well as organising inter-corps leagues and cups, the Army FA also organises representative games against the Royal Navy, Royal Air Force and civilian teams, with home games being played at the Aldershot Military Stadium.

Army FA Cup
The Army FA Challenge Cup is the foremost football cup competition for teams affiliated to the Army FA.

The current holders are 21 Engineer Regiment who beat 3 Regiment Army Air Corps in the 2019 final.

See also
Royal Air Force Football Association
Royal Marines Football Association
Royal Navy Football Association

References

External links
 Official website

County football associations
 
Organisations based in Hampshire
Sports organizations established in 1888
football